Jamie Roberts Woodson (born March 6, 1972), is the executive chairperson and chief executive officer of the State Collaborative on Reforming Education (SCORE), a Tennessee-based nonprofit and nonpartisan education research and advocacy organization.  Previously she served as a state senator in the Tennessee General Assembly (2005–11) and was Speaker Pro Tem and Chairman of the Senate Education Committee.  Earlier she served three two-year terms in the state House of Representatives (1999 to 2005).

Biography
She attended the University of Tennessee (UT) in Knoxville and graduated with a Bachelor of Arts degree and a J.D. She was a member of Alpha Omicron Pi sorority while she was at UT.  She was admitted to the Tennessee Bar and works as an attorney.  Her first marriage was to Jeff Hagood, whose surname she used during the first several years of her political career.

She won election to a two-year term in the Tennessee House of Representatives in 1998 as a Republican, representing the 17th State House District. She won re-election in 2000 and 2002, serving in the 101st through 103rd General Assemblies. In 2004 she was elected to a four-year term in the state senate.

In the summer of 2005 she was married to Knoxville lawyer William (Bill) Woodson, Jr., at the couple's farm "Horse Fly Farm." Upon her marriage, she assumed her new husband's last name. She has three stepchildren: Joseph, Elizabeth, and Caitlin.

Woodson represented the 6th district in the Tennessee Senate. The district at the time comprised the majority of Knox County. After her first term in the state senate, she was re-elected in 2008 to a second four-year term. In January 2009 she was elected Speaker Pro-Tem for the 106th General Assembly (2009–2010).

During the 105th General Assembly (2007–2008) she served as the Secretary of the Senate Republican Caucus, as the chair of the Senate Education Committee, and as a member of the Senate Judiciary Committee and the Senate Transportation Committee. In 2007 she sponsored legislation that resulted in a major revision to Tennessee's K-12 education funding formula, creating Basic Education Program 2.0, often known as BEP 2.0. She also helped lead efforts to improve education, including to identify and support effective teaching, raise academic standards for Tennessee students, turn around low-performing schools, and expand high-quality public charter schools in Tennessee.

In April 2011 Woodson announced that she would resign her Senate seat after the 2011 session of the General Assembly.  She then became the head of SCORE, an education reform organization started by former U.S. Senator Bill Frist. SCORE focuses on achieving three student achievement goals for Tennessee: being among the fastest-improving states and ranked in the top half of states in student achievement on the National Assessment of Educational Progress by 2020; closing student achievement gaps at every grade level and in all subject areas by income, race, geographic location, and student need; and preparing every Tennessee student to graduate ready for postsecondary education and the workforce.

Woodson also serves on the Tennessee Fish & Wildlife Commission  and the boards of the Governor’s Foundation for Health and Wellness, Tennessee Business Roundtable, and the Policy Innovators in Education (PIE) Network.

References

External links
Jamie Woodson's profile at Project Vote Smart
Jamie Woodson's campaign website, as presented in February 2005 before going offline
State Collaborative on Reforming Education

Living people
Republican Party Tennessee state senators
Republican Party members of the Tennessee House of Representatives
Women state legislators in Tennessee
1972 births
University of Tennessee alumni
21st-century American women